Gisela Dulko was the defending champion, but withdrew due to gastrointestinal illness.
Sara Errani won the title, defeating Flavia Pennetta 5–7, 7–6(7–2), 6–0 in the final.

Seeds

Draw

Finals

Top half

Bottom half

Qualifying

Seeds

Qualifiers

Lucky losers
  Estrella Cabeza Candela

Draw

First qualifier

Second qualifier

Third qualifier

Fourth qualifier

External links
 WTA tournament draws

Abierto Mexicano Telcel - Singles
2012 Abierto Mexicano Telcel